Abaciscus costimacula is a species of moth belonging to the family Geometridae. It was described by Alfred Ernest Wileman in 1912. It is known from Taiwan, China, Sumatra, Peninsular Malaysia and Borneo.

References

Boarmiini
Moths described in 1912
Moths of Borneo
Moths of Asia
Moths of Indonesia
Moths of Malaysia
Moths of Sumatra
Moths of Taiwan